Jahrom County is in Fars province, Iran. The capital of the county is the city of Jahrom. At the 2006 census, the county's population was 197,331 in 48,335 households. The following census in 2011 counted 209,312 people in 58,940 households. At the 2016 census, the county's population was 228,532 in 70,187 households. Khafr District was separated from the county in 2019 to become Khafr County.

Administrative divisions

The population history and structural changes of Jahrom County's administrative divisions over three consecutive censuses are shown in the following table. The latest census shows four districts, 12 rural districts, and five cities.

Geography 
Jahrom County is located in the south of Fars province and has an area of 3,926 square kilometers. The county is bounded from the north by Khafr County, from the east by Fasa County and Zarrin Dasht County, from the south by Juyom County, from the west by Firuzabad County and Qir and Karzin County. The average altitude of this county is about 50 meters, and its highest point, Sefidar Peak, between Khafr county and Simakan District, is about 317 meters, and its lowest point is about 85 meters above sea level in Simian District. Qarah-Aghaj,  and the Shur and Simakan rivers are among the waterways of Jahrom.

References

 

Counties of Fars Province